Khwairakpam is a Meitei surname. Notable people with the surname include:

 Khwairakpam Chaoba (1895–1950), Indian poet, essayist, and novelist
 Khwairakpam Loken Singh, Indian politician
 Ulenyai Khwairakpam (born 2003), Indian cricketer

Indian surnames